State of the Nation (formerly State of the Nation with Jessica Soho) is a Philippine television news broadcasting show broadcast by GMA News TV and GTV. Originally anchored by Jessica Soho, it premiered on February 28, 2011. Maki Pulido and Atom Araullo currently serve as the anchors.

Overview
The show features several guests to analyze the issues of the Philippines, as well as reports and rundown of the day's news.

In March 2020, the show was temporarily suspended due to the enhanced community quarantine in Luzon caused by the COVID-19 pandemic. The show resumed its programming on September 21, 2020.

On January 4, 2021, Maki Pulido and Atom Araullo replaced Jessica Soho as anchors. In February 2021, GMA News TV was rebranded as GTV, with the show being carried over.

Anchors

 Maki Pulido 
 Atom Araullo 

Former anchor
 Jessica Soho

Accolades

References

External links
 
 

2011 Philippine television series debuts
Filipino-language television shows
GMA Integrated News and Public Affairs shows
GMA News TV original programming
GTV (Philippine TV network) original programming
Philippine television news shows
Television productions suspended due to the COVID-19 pandemic
Sign language television shows